Claudio de la Torre may refer to:

 Claudio de la Torre (writer) (1895–1973), Spanish novelist, poet, dramatist and film director
 Claudio de la Torre (actor) (born 1980), Venezuelan model and actor